Ryan Francis Rossiter (born September 14, 1989) is a US-born Japanese professional basketball power forward for the Alvark Tokyo of the B.League. Rossiter was named Metro Atlantic Athletic Conference player of the year and an All-American as a senior at Siena College in 2010–11.

College career
Rossiter, a 6'9" big man out of Monsignor Farrell High School in Staten Island, New York, played college basketball at Siena College.  Rossiter showed signs of potential as a freshman, starting 11 games as the Saints made the 2008 NCAA tournament.  As a sophomore, he started all 34 games and averaged 10.0 points and 7.9 rebounds per game as the Saints made another NCAA tournament appearance.

As a junior Rossiter broke out, averaging 13.8 points and 11.1 rebounds per game and leading the conference in rebounding and field goal percentage (.571).  Rossiter was named first team all-conference as the Saints won their third straight MAAC title and NCAA appearance.  As a senior, Rossiter improved again.  He averaged 18.7 points and 13.2 rebounds per game (placing him second nationally in rebounds per game to Morehead State's Kenneth Faried).  Rossiter was named MAAC player of the year and an honorable mention Associated Press All-American.  Rossiter graduated as Siena's all-time leading rebounder with 1,151 in his four years.  He finished with 1,457 points and 167 blocked shots (third in school history).

Professional career
After the completion of his college career, Rossiter was not selected in the 2011 NBA Draft.  He signed with Denain ASC Voltaire of the French LNB Pro B in August 2011.  For the season, Rossiter averaged 13.8 points and 9.7 rebounds per game.

In 2012, Rossiter made the roster of the Canton Charge of the NBA Development League. In 2013, he joined Link Tochigi Brex in Japan. Rossiter won the Japan National Basketball League's MVP Trophy for the month of December 2013, a month in which he averaged 24.1 points per game and 13.1 rebounds per game. Rossiter returned to play for Link Tochigi Brex for the 2014-2015 Japan Basketball League season. During the 2017 B.League Semifinals, Rossiter hit a game winning layup with 2 seconds remaining to send his team to the finals, which they then won.

The Basketball Tournament
Ryan Rossiter played for Saints Alive in the 2018 edition of The Basketball Tournament. He scored 26 points and had 17 rebounds in the team's first-round loss to Team Fancy.

Career statistics 

|-
| align="left" | 2013-14
| align="left" | Tochigi
| 54|| 54|| 32.9|| .580|| .306|| .737|| 11.8|| 1.8|| 0.9|| 1.1|| 21.3 
|-
| align="left" | 2014-15
| align="left" | Tochigi
| 53||52 || 33.5|| .538|| .500|| .645|| 13.3|| 3.1|| 1.1|| 1.1||  19.9 
|-
| align="left" |  2015-16
| align="left" | Tochigi
| 47||47 || 35.7|| .552|| .231|| .527|| 12.6|| 3.1|| 1.9|| 0.9||  23.7
|-
| align="left"  style="background-color:#afe6ba; border: 1px solid gray" |  2016-17†
| align="left" | Tochigi
|  59||59  || 30.7 || .507 ||.284  ||.445  ||bgcolor="CFECEC"|13.3*  ||3.2  ||1.5  ||0.8||17.3
|-
| align="left" |  2017-18
| align="left" | Tochigi
|  57||56  || 28.3 || .465 ||.339  ||.426  ||10.2  ||4.4  ||1.2  ||0.3||13.5
|-
|}

References

External links
NBA D-League Profile

1989 births
Living people
American expatriate basketball people in France
American expatriate basketball people in Japan
American men's basketball players
Basketball players from New York City
Canton Charge players
Denain Voltaire Basket players
Japanese people of American descent
Monsignor Farrell High School alumni
Power forwards (basketball)
Siena Saints men's basketball players
Sportspeople from Staten Island
Utsunomiya Brex players